The Chery A15, also known as Cowin, Flagcloud or Amulet, is a subcompact car produced by the Chinese manufacturer Chery from 2003 to 2010. A facelifted variant was called the Cowin 2 and was sold from 2010 to 2016.

Overview
It is based on a restyling of the Chery A11 (also known as the Fengyun, or Windcloud), itself based on the first generation of the SEAT Toledo, which was built on the Volkswagen Group A2 platform. This is the same platform as is used in the second generation Volkswagen Golf. The vehicle also has a fuel-efficient, low-emission engine. It has been marketed in South America and in European countries such as Ukraine and Russia. 

It was launched in August 2003, as a successor to the Fengyun (Windcloud), and has been exported to more than 30 countries in Southeast Asia, Latin America, and Eastern Europe. In 2010, it was locally assembled and went on sale in Russia as the Vortex Corda in 2012.

Safety
It has several safety features, including anti-lock brakes and electronic brakeforce distribution. However, the Russian car magazine Autoreview reported that an A15 it had crashed in accordance with the Euro NCAP test standard performed even worse than the 1-starred Brilliance BS6 sedan and that the dummy used had to be dismantled into pieces in order to be removed. Consequently, Autoreview called for the car to be withdrawn from the market.

References

A15
Cars introduced in 2003
Subcompact cars
2010s cars